Stevens Mountain is a mountain located in the Catskill Mountains of New York southeast of Gilboa. Reed Hill is located north-northwest, Bull Hill is located northeast, and Mount Royal is located south of Sicklers Mountain.

References

Mountains of Schoharie County, New York
Mountains of New York (state)